The Austria national badminton team represents Austria in international badminton team competitions and is controlled by the Austrian Badminton Association (Austrian German: Österreichischer Badmintonverband). Austria participated in the Sudirman Cup from 1989 until 2017.

The men's team were quarterfinalists at the 2006 European Men's Team Badminton Championships. The Austrian team also competes in the Helvetia Cup.

History 
Badminton was first played in Austria in the year 1955. The national team was formed after the establishment of the Austrian Badminton Association in August 1957. The national association soon held its very first national championships to crown the best player to represent the national team in team events.

Austria made their first international team appearance when the mixed team competed at the 1962 Helvetia Cup. The team did well to achieve third place in their first time competing internationally.

Men's team 
The Austrian men's team first competed in qualifying for the 1982 Thomas Cup. The team were humiliated on home soil after losing 0–9 against the Netherlands in Pressbaum. The team had better results two years later after beating Norway 3–2 in the 1984 Thomas Cup qualifiers. In 1996, the Austrian team advanced to the semifinal stages of the 1996 Thomas Cup qualifiers but failed to advance further after failing to top the group.

Austria then competed in the first European Men's Team Championships in 2006. The team topped their group in the group stages and advanced to the quarter-finals but lost 0–3 to their Dutch rivals. The men's team have failed to get past the group stage of the European Men's Team Championships since 2008.

Women's team 
The women's team took part in qualifying for the 1984 Uber Cup. The team lost 0–5 to Scotland, but won 5–0 against Zambia and Switzerland to finish as group runner-up.

The team competed in the first two Europe Women's Team Badminton Championships in 2006 and 2008. They never got past the group stages.

Mixed team 
The mixed team first competed in the 1962 Helvetia Cup and won against Belgium and Switzerland to finish third in the round robin tournament. The team went a step further the next year and finished as runners-up in the 1963 Helvetia Cup. Austria then went on to compete in the 1972 European Mixed Team Badminton Championships and were eliminated in the quarter-finals.

The team competed in the inaugural edition of the Sudirman Cup in 1989. The team were placed in Group 5 with New Zealand, Finland and the United States. The team lost all their matches against New Zealand and the United States but managed to win a match against Finland to finish in 22nd place. In 1990, the Austrian team strived and were crowned champions for the first time at the 1990 Helvetia Cup. In the 1993 Sudirman Cup, Austria shown improvement after topping their group and finishing in 19th place.

The Austrian team competed for the next few European Mixed Team Badminton Championships until 2011 and have never been able to get past the group stage. The team have failed to qualify for the Sudirman Cup since 2017.

Competitive record

Sudirman Cup

European Team Championships

Men's team

Women's team

Mixed team

Helvetia Cup

Junior competitive record

Suhandinata Cup

European Junior Team Championships

Mixed Team

Finlandia Cup

Mixed team

Staff 
The following list shows the coaching staff of the Austrian badminton team.

Players

Current squad

Men's team

Women's team

References 

Badminton
National badminton teams
Badminton in Austria